Purine nucleoside phosphorylase, PNP, PNPase or inosine phosphorylase is an enzyme that in humans is encoded by the NP gene. It catalyzes the chemical reaction

purine nucleoside + phosphate  purine + alpha-D-ribose 1-phosphate

Thus, the two substrates of this enzyme are a purine nucleoside and phosphate, whereas its products are a purine and alpha-D-ribose 1-phosphate.

Nomenclature 

This enzyme belongs to the family of glycosyltransferases, specifically the pentosyltransferases.  The systematic name of this enzyme class is purine-nucleoside:phosphate ribosyltransferase.

Other names in common use include:

 inosine phosphorylase
 PNPase
 PUNPI
 PUNPII
 inosine-guanosine phosphorylase
 nucleotide phosphatase
 purine deoxynucleoside phosphorylase
 purine deoxyribonucleoside phosphorylase
 purine nucleoside phosphorylase
 purine ribonucleoside phosphorylas

This enzyme participates in 3 metabolic pathways: purine metabolism, pyrimidine metabolism, and nicotinate and nicotinamide metabolism.

Function 
Purine nucleoside phosphorylase is an enzyme involved in purine metabolism. PNP metabolizes inosine into hypoxanthine and guanosine into guanine, in each case creating ribose phosphate. Note: adenosine is first metabolized to  inosine via the enzyme adenosine deaminase.

Nucleoside phosphorylase is an enzyme which cleaves a nucleoside by phosphorylating the ribose to produce a nucleobase and ribose 1 phosphate. It is one enzyme of the nucleotide salvage pathways. These pathways allow the cell to produce nucleotide monophosphates when the de novo synthesis pathway has been interrupted or is non-existent (as is the case in the brain). Often the de novo pathway is interrupted as a result of chemotherapy drugs such as methotrexate or aminopterin.

All salvage pathway enzymes require a high energy phosphate donor such as ATP or PRPP.

 Thymidine can be phosphorylated by thymidine kinase (TK).
 Uridine can be phosphorylated by uridine kinase (UK).
 Cytidine can be phosphorylated by cytidine kinase (CK).
 Deoxycytidine can be phosphorylated by deoxycytidine kinase (DCK).

Adenosine uses the enzyme adenosine kinase, which is a very important enzyme in the cell. Attempts are being made to develop an inhibitor for the enzyme for use in cancer chemotherapy.

Enzyme regulation 

This protein may use the morpheein model of allosteric regulation.

Clinical significance 

PNPase, together with adenosine deaminase (ADA), serves a key role in purine catabolism, referred to as the salvage pathway. Mutations in ADA lead to an accumulation of (d)ATP, which inhibits ribonucleotide reductase, leading to a deficiency in (d)CTPs and (d)TTPs, which, in turn, induces apoptosis in T-lymphocytes and B-lymphocytes, leading to severe combined immunodeficiency (SCID).

PNP-deficient patients will have an immunodeficiency problem.  It affects only T-cells; B-cells are unaffected by the deficiency.

See also 
 Purine nucleoside phosphorylase deficiency

References

Further reading 

 
 
 
 
 
 
 
 
 
 
 
 
 
 
 
 
 
 
 
 
 Boyer, P.D., Lardy, H. and Myrback, K. (Eds.), The Enzymes, 2nd ed., vol. 5, Academic Press, New York, 1961, p. 237-255.

External links 
Human PNP at Cornell University
E. Coli PNP at Cornell University

EC 2.4.2
Enzymes of known structure